Sterkia is a genus of minute, air-breathing, land snails, terrestrial pulmonate gastropod mollusks which were formerly classified in the family Pupillidae now in the family Vertiginidae instead.

Species
Species within the genus Sterkia include:
 Sterkia antillensis Pilsbry, 1920
 Sterkia bakeri Pilsbry, 1921
 Sterkia eyriesii (Drouët, 1859) - Caribbean Birddrop

Synonyms 
 Sterkia calamitosa (Pilsbry, 1889) - Mexican birddrop: synonym of Vertigo calamitosa (Pilsbry, 1889)
 Sterkia clementina (Sterki, 1890) - insular birddrop: synonym of Vertigo clementina (Sterki, 1890) (superseded combination)
 Sterkia hemphilli (Sterki, 1890) - California Birddrop: synonym of Vertigo hemphilli (Sterki, 1890) (superseded combination)

References

 Nekola, J.C.; Chiba, S.; Coles, B.F.; Drost, C.A.; Proschwitz, T. von; Horsák, M. (2018). A phylogenetic overview of the genus Vertigo O. F. Müller, 1773 (Gastropoda: Pulmonata: Pupillidae: Vertigininae). Malacologia. 62(1): 21–161.

Vertiginidae